The  Niota Depot is a historic railroad depot in Niota in the U.S. state of Tennessee. Built in 1853, it is the oldest remaining pre–Civil War railroad depot in the state. It now serves as the Niota city hall.

References

Buildings and structures in McMinn County, Tennessee
Railway buildings and structures in Tennessee